FK Mladost GAT is a football club from Novi Sad, Serbia. Founded in 1972, they play in the Serbian SuperLiga, specifically in the first tier of Serbian Football.

The clubs fans call themselves the Serbian Coyotes.

Honours
Serbian First League (Tier 2)
  Champions (1): 2021–22

Current squad

Club officials
As of July 29, 2022

Technical staff

Management

References

Football clubs in Vojvodina
Mladost